The Women's team sprint was held on 19 October 2012. 4 nations participated.

Medalists

Results
The fastest 2 teams raced for gold and 3rd and 4th teams raced for bronze.

Qualifying
It was held at 14:27.

Finals
The finals were held at 20:16.

References

Women's team sprint
European Track Championships – Women's team sprint